Post-harvest losses may refer to:
 Post-harvest losses (vegetables)
 Post-harvest losses (grains)